10.000 may represent either:
 the number 10000 (the point being a thousands separator, as common in many European countries)
 the number 10 known to five significant figures, i.e. 10±0.0005 (here the dot is a decimal separator, as commonly used in much of the English-speaking world)

See also 
 10000 (disambiguation)